Bryan Murray may refer to:

Bryan Murray (actor) (born 1949), Irish actor
Bryan Murray (ice hockey) (1942–2017), Canadian ice hockey coach and executive

See also
Brian Murray (disambiguation)